The New Canadian Library is a publishing imprint of the Canadian company McClelland and Stewart. The series aims to present classic works of Canadian literature in paperback. Each work published in the series includes a short essay by another notable Canadian writer, discussing the historical context and significance of the work. These essays were originally forewords, but after McClelland and Stewart's 1985 sale to Avie Bennett, the prefatory material was abandoned and replaced by afterwords.

It was founded by Malcolm Ross with the intention of providing affordable material for his students; David Staines has been the general editor of the series since 1986. In 2007 the University of Toronto Press published New Canadian Library: The Ross-McClelland Years, 1952-1978, a work by Janet Beverly Friskney that provides an account of the New Canadian Library during the years of Ross's editorship.

Titles in the New Canadian Library

Numbered series
Originally, all titles in the series were numbered sequentially.

Unnumbered series
Books published in the collection after the sequential numbering ceased were:

Poetry collections
 Canadian Poetry: From the Beginnings Through the First World War edited by Carole Gerson and Gwendolyn Davies
 Poets Between the Wars edited by Milton Wilson
 Poets of Contemporary Canada 1960–1970 edited by Eli Mandel
 Poets of the Confederation
 Masks of Fiction
 Masks of Poetry
 Poetry of Mid-Century
 The Poems of Earle Birney
 Nineteenth-Century Narrative Poems
 The Poems of Bliss Carman
 Poems of Al Purdy
 The Damnation of Vancouver
 The Selected Poems of Irving Layton

Canadian writers
 Marshall McLuhan
 E. J. Pratt
 Margaret Laurence
 Frederick Philip Grove
 Leonard Cohen
 Mordecai Richler
 Stephen Leacock
 Hugh MacLennan
 Earle Birney
 Northrop Frye
 Malcolm Lowry
 James Reaney
 George Woodcock
 Farley Mowat
 Ernest Buckler
 Morley Callaghan
 Robertson Davies

Notes

External links
 New Canadian Library web site at McClelland and Stewart
 Archive of New Canadian Library web site at McClelland and Stewart

 
1958 establishments in Canada